Guajira may refer to:
 Guajira Peninsula, a peninsula in the northernmost part of South America shared by Colombia and Venezuela
 Guajiro people (Wayuu), a South American ethnic group inhabiting northeastern Colombia and northwestern Venezuela
 guajiro bean (also known as the kapeshuna bean), a set of heirloom cultivars of the cowpea grown chiefly in northeastern Colombia
 La Guajira Department, a department of Colombia which includes most of the Guajira Peninsula
 La Guajira Desert, a desert which covers most of  the Guajira Peninsula
 Guajira (music), a style of Cuban music, song or dance
 Guajira (TV series), a Colombian telenovela
 Guajira (slag), is also another way to describe a woman that works and lives in a rural area.

See also 
 La Guajira (disambiguation)

Guajira is also another way to describe a woman that works and lives in a rural area.